Goalball at the 1988 Summer Paralympics consisted of men's and women's team events.

Medal summary

Men's tournament 
15 men's teams competed.

Qualification 
Group A

Group B

Classification rounds 
Classification 11-12

Classification 9-10

Classification 7-8

Final round 
Semifinals

Bronze medal match

Gold medal match

Women's tournament 
7 women's teams competed.
Preliminaries

Final round
Semifinals

Bronze medal match

Gold medal match

References 

 

1988 Summer Paralympics events
1988
Goalball in South Korea